Tehmina Dasti is a Pakistani politician. She is daughter of Amjad Hameed Khan Dasti and granddaughter of Abdul Hamid Khan Dasti.

Political career 
She contested to be a member of the National Assembly of Pakistan from NA-182 (Muzaffargarh-II), in 2018, from PTI and got 33942 votes. Previously, in 2002, she was elected to one of the seats reserved for women in the National Assembly of Pakistan 2002-2007.
She also unsuccessfully contested in the 2005 elections for district Nazim.

References 

Living people
People from Muzaffargarh
Politicians from Muzaffargarh
Pakistani MNAs 2002–2007
Year of birth missing (living people)